Hakim Malek (born 4 April 1972) is a French former professional footballer who played as a midfielder.

Career
Malek started his career with Vitrolles, before joining Ligue 2 side Toulon in 1997, where he made 32 league appearances for Toulon in the 1997–98 season. He moved to Martigues in the summer of 1998 and spent a season with the Championnat National side before returning to Vitrolles, where he ended his career.

In 2003, Malek was appointed manager of Consolat Marseille and he held the post for five years before moving to amateur side Saint Marcel. He had a spell as manager of Algerian side El Eulma during the 2010–11 season before returning to Saint Marcel. In January 2012, he was re-hired by Consolat following the departure of Bernard Bouger.

References

1972 births
Living people
People from Rognac
French footballers
Association football midfielders
SC Toulon players
FC Martigues players
Ligue 2 players
French football managers
French sportspeople of Algerian descent
Sportspeople from Bouches-du-Rhône
Footballers from Provence-Alpes-Côte d'Azur